The Hida-class patrol vessel are a class of patrol vessel within the PL series (Large patrol vessel) of the Japan Coast Guard (JCG). The class name "Hida" is named after Hida Mountains, the northernmost mountain range of the Japanese Alps, a famous mountain range in Japan.

The class is one of the more modern patrol vessel classes designed to intercept North Korean (DPRK) spy boats. These classes are referred to as "High-speed, high-functionality patrol vessel, large" (高速高機能大型巡視船). The vessels carry a Bofors 40 mm L/70 autocannon with a laser-optical fire-control system, and are able to safely deal with heavily armed spy boats of the DPRK which intrude into Japanese waters. The hull of this class is bulletproof in cases of close-range firefights using small arms.

Ships of this class are among the leading vessels of flotillas intended for spy boat interception. With the helicopter deck of this class, a Special Security Team can arrive at the scene aboard Eurocopter EC225 helicopters. The broadband SATCOM system of this class can relay video data from helicopters to the ground station or the HQ of the JCG. This class is equipped with a LIDAR system to acquire targets with high accuracy, and at the same time, this system enables them to perform search and rescue mission more safely.

Ships in the class

See also
 List of Japan Coast Guard vessels and aircraft
  – another class of High-speed, high-functionality patrol vessel, large.

References

Bibliography
 
 
 

Patrol vessels of the Japan Coast Guard
Patrol ship classes